The members of the family Percichthyidae are known as the temperate perches. They belong to the order Perciformes, the perch-like fishes.

The name Percichthyidae derives from the Latin perca for perch and Ancient Greek ἰχθύς, ichthys for fish.

Classification
The temperate perches are closely related to the temperate basses of the family Moronidae, and older literature treats the latter as belonging to the family Percichthyidae.  Australian freshwater percichthyids were once placed in the marine grouper family, Serranidae, and the two families are thought to be closely related.

Almost 40 species of percichthyids are now recognised, grouped in 11–12 genera. Most but not all are exclusively freshwater fishes.  They are mainly found in Australia, but species are also found in southern South America (Percichthys).

More recently the Chinese perches have been classified in the separate family Sinipercidae while the genus Percilia has been found not to be closely related to either that family or the Percichthyidae and has been placed in its own monotypic family Perciliidae.

The following 8 genera are classified within the family Percichthyidae:

 Bostockia Castelnau, 1873
 Gadopsis Richardson, 1848
 Guyu Pusey & Kennard, 2001
 Maccullochella Whitley, 1929
 Macquaria Cuvier, 1830
 Nannatherina Regan, 1906
 Nannoperca Günther, 1861
 Percichthys Girard, 1855

Some workers have found that the genus Macquaria is polyphyletic and that the two catadromous species Macquaria colonorum and M. novemaculeata are not the closest relatives of the other two species in the genus and are placed in the genus Percalates in the monotypic family Percalatidae These authors also found that the Percichthyidae and the Percalatidae were part of one of three clades within a new order, the Centrarchiformes in the Percomorpha.

Species
Australia has the greatest number of percichthyid species, where they are represented by the Australian freshwater cods (Maccullochella spp.), which are Murray cod, Mary River cod, eastern freshwater cod, and trout cod, by the Australian freshwater blackfishes (Gadopsis spp.), which are river blackfish and two-spined blackfish, and by the Australian freshwater perches which are golden perch, Macquarie perch (Macquaria spp.), and Australian bass, and estuary perch (Percalates spp.).

Several other Australian freshwater species also sit within the family Percichthyidae, while research using mitochondrial DNA suggests the species of the family Nannopercidae are in reality percichthyids, as well.  Australia is unique in having a freshwater fish fauna dominated by percichthyids and allied families/species.  This in contrast to Europe and Asia, whose fish faunas are dominated by members of the Cyprinidae carp family.  (Australia does not have a single naturally occurring cyprinid species; unfortunately, the illegal introduction of carp has now established the family's presence in Australia.)

A single genus occurs outside Australia, Percichthys in southern South America.

A number of species are or have been important food species; some of these (e.g. the Murray cod, Maccullochella peelii peelii) have become threatened through overfishing and river regulation, while others are now farmed to some extent.  Some smaller species (e.g. Balston's pygmy perch, Nannatherina balstoni) are popular in aquaria.

The extremely rare Bloomfield River cod, Guyu wujalwujalensis, is only found in a short stretch of the Bloomfield River in north Queensland.

Timeline

See also
Howella

References

External links

Fishbase, Family Percichthyidae - Temperate perches

Taxa named by David Starr Jordan
Taxa named by Carl H. Eigenmann